Ekanayake or Ekanayaka is a Sinhalese surname. Notable people with the surname include:

 Chandra Ekanayake, Sri Lankan lawyer and judge
 Ekanayake Edward Rohan Amerasekera, first indigenous Commander of the Sri Lanka Air Force
 Dilhani Ekanayake (born 1973), Sri Lankan actress
 Nandimithra Ekanayake (born 1943), Sri Lankan politician
 Narendra Ekanayake (born 1977), Bahamian cricketer
 Niluka Ekanayake, 10th Governor of Central Province, Sri Lanka
 Nuwan Ekanayake (born 1980), Sri Lankan cricketer
 Sarath Ekanayake, Sri Lankan politician
 Sepala Ekanayake (born 1949), Sri Lankan hijacker
 T. B. Ekanayake (1954–2020), Sri Lankan politician
 Thanuga Ekanayake, Sri Lankan cricketer
 W. B. Ekanayake (born 1948), Sri Lankan politician

See also
 
 

Sinhalese surnames